Accept are a German heavy metal band from Solingen. Formed in 1976, the group originally featured lead guitarist Wolf Hoffmann, bassist Peter Baltes, lead vocalist Udo Dirkschneider, drummer Frank Friedrich and rhythm guitarist Gerhard Wahl. The band's current lineup includes Hoffmann, lead vocalist Mark Tornillo (since 2009), rhythm guitarist Uwe Lulis, drummer Christopher Williams (both since 2015), bassist Martin Motnik and rhythm guitarist Philip Shouse (both since 2019).

History

1976–1994
Accept evolved from an earlier group called Band X, with the first lineup including Wolf Hoffmann, Peter Baltes, Udo Dirkschneider, Frank Friedrich and Gerhard Wahl. Wahl was replaced by Jörg Fischer in 1978. After the recording of the group's self-titled debut album, Friedrich left Accept and was replaced by Stefan Kaufmann. Fischer left suddenly after a tour in 1982. He was replaced briefly by Jan Koemmet, followed by Herman Frank shortly before the release of Restless and Wild. Fischer returned to replace Frank shortly after the release of Balls to the Wall.

In 1987, Dirkschneider was fired from Accept and subsequently pursued a solo career under the moniker U.D.O. He was replaced by a succession of temporary vocalists, before the band settled on David Reece and released Eat the Heat in 1989. Fischer left again before the recording of the album. Jim Stacey joined on rhythm guitar for the album's promotional tour, which also saw Ken Mary take over from Kaufmann after the regular drummer suffered a back injury. Accept subsequently decided to disband, after increasing differences with Reece and Kaufmann's injury. By 1992, the band had returned with a lineup of Dirkschneider, Hoffmann, Baltes and Kaufmann, releasing Objection Overruled the next year. Kaufmann was forced to leave again after the release of Death Row, with Stefan Schwarzmann taking his place.

Since 1994
After the Death Row touring cycle, Schwarzmann was replaced by Michael Cartellone, who performed on 1996's Predator. The group disbanded for a second time in 1997. In 2005, Accept returned for a short run of shows in Europe and Japan, with Dirkschneider, Hoffmann and Baltes joined by Frank and Schwarzmann. The tour ended in August, after which Hoffmann claimed that Dirkschneider was preventing a longer reunion for the band. Members returned to other projects until 2009, when a new lineup of Accept was unveiled with vocalist Mark Tornillo in place of Dirkschneider. The group's lineup remained stable until 2014, when Frank and Schwarzmann were fired. Their places were taken in April 2015 by Uwe Lulis and Christopher Williams, respectively. Baltes quit the band in November 2018.

For tour dates in early 2019, Baltes was replaced by Danny Silvestri, who had previously played with the group in 2017. In April, the band brought in Martin Motnik as their new full-time bassist. On 1 November, the band announced that Philip Shouse, previously a touring member, had joined them as their third guitarist, thus making them a sextet.

Members

Current

Former

Touring

Timeline

Lineups

References

External links
Accept official website

Accept